Ibotenic acid or (S)-2-amino-2-(3-hydroxyisoxazol-5-yl)acetic acid, also referred to as ibotenate, is a chemical compound and psychoactive drug which occurs naturally in Amanita muscaria and related species of mushrooms typically found in the temperate and boreal regions of the northern hemisphere. It is a prodrug of muscimol, broken down by the liver to that much stabler compound. It is a conformationally-restricted analogue of the neurotransmitter glutamate, and due to its structural similarity to this neurotransmitter, acts as a non-selective glutamate receptor agonist. Because of this, ibotenic acid can be a powerful neurotoxin in high doses, and is employed as a "brain-lesioning agent" through cranial injections in scientific research. The neurotoxic effects appear to be dose-related and risks are unclear through consumption of ibotenic-acid containing fungi, although thought to be negligible in small doses.

Pharmacology

Ibotenic acid acts as a potent agonist of the NMDA and group I (mGluR1 and mGluR5) and II (mGluR2 and mGluR3) metabotropic glutamate receptors. It is inactive at group III mGluRs. Ibotenic acid also acts as a weak agonist of the AMPA and kainate receptors. In addition, due to in vivo decarboxylation into muscimol, it acts indirectly as a potent GABAA and GABAA-ρ receptor agonist. Unlike muscimol—the principal psychoactive constituent of Amanita muscaria that is understood to cause sedation and delirium—ibotenic acid's psychoactive effects are not known independent of its serving as a prodrug to muscimol, however it may be speculated that it would act as a stimulant.

Biological properties

Mechanism of action

Ibotenic acid is an agonist of glutamate receptors, specifically at both the N-methyl-D-aspartate, or NMDA, and trans-ACPD receptor sites in multiple systems in the central nervous system.  Ibotenic neurotoxicity can be enhanced by glycine and blocked by dizocilpine. Dizocilpine acts as an uncompetitive antagonist at NMDA receptors.

Ibotenic acid toxicity comes from activation of the NMDA receptors.  NMDA receptors are related to synaptic plasticity and work with metabotropic glutamate receptors to establish long term potentiation or LTP.  The process of long term potentiation is believed to be related to the acquisition of information.  The NMDA receptor functions properly by allowing Ca2+ ions to pass through after activation at the receptor site. 

The binding of ibotenic acid allows excess Ca2+ into the system which results in neuronal cell death. Ca2+ also activates CaM-KII or Ca2+/Calmodulin Kinase which phosphorylates multiple enzymes.  The activated enzymes then begin producing reactive oxygen species which damages surrounding tissue.  The excess Ca2+ results in the enhancement of the mitochondrial electron transport system which will further increase the number of reactive oxygen species.

Biological effects

Ibotenic acid typically affects both NMDA and APCD or metabolotropic quisqualate receptor sites in the central nervous system. Due to their targeting of these systems the symptoms associated with Ibotenic acid poisoning are often related to perception and control.

The majority of ingested ibotenic acid is likely decarboxylated into muscimol so the effects of ingesting ibotenic acid are similar to muscimol's effects. Symptoms associated with ibotenic acid are usually onset within 30–60 minutes and include a range of nervous system effects.  The most common symptoms include nausea, vomiting, and drowsiness.  However, after the first hour symptoms begin to include confusion, euphoria, visual and auditory distortions, sensations of floating, and retrograde amnesia.

Symptoms are slightly different for children, typically beginning after 30–180 minutes.  Dominant symptoms in children include ataxia, obtundation, and lethargy.  Seizures are occasionally reported, however, more commonly with children.

Treatment

 
Treatment of ibotenic acid poisoning is limited and varies as the toxic dose of the compound varies from person to person.  Patients admitted to the hospital for ibotenic acid poisoning are typically given charcoal in order to stop the absorption of the compound and prevent further intoxication.  Upon receiving charcoal treatment the patient's vital signs are monitored and toxicity usually lasts between 6 and 8 hours; however, some symptoms may take up to a few days to subside.  Occasionally, to reduce the discomfort associated with symptoms, benzodiazepines will be administered to control panic attacks and hallucinations.

Special attention should be given to monitoring breathing, airway control, and circulation. If treatment occurs within the first hour of ingestion gastric lavage may be effective.  If vomiting becomes too intense intravenous fluids are administered, psychiatric care may also be provided.

In rare cases anticholinergic drugs, such as atropine, may be needed.

Use in research

Ibotenic acid used for the lesioning of rat's brains is kept frozen in a phosphate-buffered Saline Solutionat a pH of 7.4, and can be kept for up to a year with no loss in toxicity. Injection of .05-.1 microliters of Ibotenic acid into the hippocampus at a rate of .1 microliter/min resulted in semi-selective lesioning. Hippocampal lesioning led to a considerable loss of cells in pyramidal cells (CA1-CA3) as well as granule cells in the dentate gyrus. Ibotenic acid lesioning also causes some damage to axons along the perforant pathway.

Typically, when lesioning is done with other chemicals the subject can not relearn a task.  However, due to Ibotenic acid's reactivity with glutamate receptors such as the NMDA receptor, Ibotenic acid lesioning does allow the subject to relearn tasks.  Ibotenic acid lesioning is thus preferred in studies where re-learning a task after lesioning is essential. Compared to other lesioning agents, Ibotenic acid is one of the most site-specific; however, less-damaging alternatives are presently sought.

Biosynthesis 
Ibotenic acid's biosynthetic genes are organized in a physically linked biosynthetic gene cluster. The biosynthetic pathway is initiated by hydroxylation of glutamic acid by a dedicated Fe(II)/2-oxoglutarate-dependent oxygenase. The reaction yields threo-3-hydroxyglutamic acid, which is converted into ibotenic acid, likely by enzymes encoded in the biosynthetic gene cluster.

See also
 Conotoxin
 Grayanotoxin
 Quisqualic acid
 Tetrodotoxin

References

Toxic amino acids
Psychedelic drugs
Neurotoxins
Mycotoxins found in Basidiomycota
Prodrugs
Isoxazoles
Hydroxy acids
AMPA receptor agonists
GABAA receptor agonists
GABAA-rho receptor agonists
Kainate receptor agonists
MGlu1 receptor agonists
MGlu2 receptor agonists
MGlu3 receptor agonists
MGlu5 receptor agonists
NMDA receptor agonists
Excitotoxins
Hydroxyarenes